Route 306 is a collector road in the Canadian province of Nova Scotia.

It is located in the Halifax Regional Municipality and connects Spryfield at Route 349 with Sambro at Route 349.

It is also known as "Old Sambro Road."

Communities
Spryfield
Leiblin Park
Harrietsfield
Williamswood
Sambro

Parks
Long Lake Provincial Park
Crystal Crescent Provincial Park

See also
List of Nova Scotia provincial highways

References

Nova Scotia provincial highways
Roads in Halifax, Nova Scotia